Khvansarak (also romanized as Khvānsārak, Khvānsarak, and Khvonsārak; also known as Khūnsārak) is a village in Garkan-e Shomali Rural District, Pir Bakran District, Falavarjan County, Isfahan Province, Iran. At the 2006 census, its population was 1,732, in 425 families.

References 

Populated places in Falavarjan County